Oum may refer to:

People
Boun Oum (1911–1980), Laotian prince and politician
Cam Oum (1849–1908), Laotian leader
Edouard Oum Ndeki (1976–2009), Cameroonian footballer
Monty Oum (1981–2015), American animator and writer
Oum (singer) (born 1978), Moroccan singer Oum El Ghaït Benessahraoui
Oum Chheang Sun (1900–1963), Cambodian politician
Oum Sang-il (born 1976), South Korean mathematician

Places

Inhabited places

Algeria
Oum Ali District
Oum Ali, a town in the district
Oum Drou, a town
Oum El Achar, a village
Oum El Adhaïm District
Oum El Adhaim, a town in the district
Oum El Assel, a town
Oum El Bouaghi Province
Oum El Bouaghi, a municipality in the province
Oum Laadham, a town
Oum Ladjoul, a town
Oum Sahaouine, a village
Oum Toub District
Oum Toub, a town in the district
Oum Touyour, a town
Oum Zebed, a village

Elsewhere
Oum Avnadech, a village in Mauritania
Oum Dreyga, a town in Western Sahara
Oum El Abouab, a town in Tunisia
Oum Hadjer, a city in Chad
Oum Rabia (commune), a commune in Morocco

Other places
Oum ed Diab Formation, a geological feature in Tunisia
Oum Er-Rbia River, in Morocco
Oum Lâalag, an oasis in Morocco
Oum Moung, a temple in Laos

See also
OUM (disambiguation)
Um (Korean surname)